The Model Alliance is a New York-based advocacy group focused on research and policy for models and others employed in the fashion industry.  Founded in February 2012 by model Sara Ziff along with support from others models, the Model Alliance is a 501(c)(3) nonprofit organization.

Advocacy
In addition to providing a discreet grievance reporting service, the Model Alliance advocates for the enforcement of existing child labor and contract laws, promotes equal opportunity and fosters a culture of accountability in the fashion industry.

Models who have served on the Model Alliance's Advisory Board include Coco Rocha, Milla Jovovich, Shalom Harlow, and Karen Elson.

In June 2013, the Model Alliance announced that New York State Senators Jeffrey Klein and Diane Savino had proposed legislation that would afford child models the same protections as all other child performers working in New York.

In October 2013, the Model Alliance announced that Governor Andrew M. Cuomo signed the child model bill (A.7787/S.5486) into law in New York State. In November 2013, the child model law was enacted and affords child models the same protections as other child performers working in New York State.

In February 2017, the Model Alliance released a study in which 81.5% of models reported having an underweight body mass index.

In May 2018, the Model Alliance published an open letter launching the RESPECT Program to protect models and their colleagues from sexual abuses in the fashion industry. Signed and supported by many of the world’s top models.  
 Amy Lemons Doutzen Kroes Edie Campbell Frederique van der Wal Gisele Bundchen Karen Elson Milla Jovovich.

Founder

Sara Ziff is a model-turned-activist who was inspired to begin the Alliance based on her experiences in the modeling industry as a youth. At age 14, she was invited to the house of a photographer and told to take all her clothes off; later, at age 15, she went to another fashion shoot where drugs were available freely.

See also
 Equity (trade union)

External links

References

Non-profit organizations based in New York City
Fashion organizations
Workers' rights organizations based in the United States